Leslie Allen "Les" Thompson (born 23 September 1968) is an English former professional footballer who played as a left back.

Born in Cleethorpes, Lincolnshire, he started his career with Hull City, where he signed professional terms in 1987. He played 35 matches in four seasons with Hull, he famously clattered legendary Manchester United player Brian Robson in a League Cup game and in December 1988 he was sent out on loan to Scarborough, where he played three games and scored one goal. In 1991, he moved to Football League Fourth Division side Maidstone United. He spent only one season with Maidstone, playing 38 times as the side struggled in the league, eventually resigning from it at the end of the 1991–92 campaign. His performances for the club had attracted bigger teams, and in the summer of 1992 he was signed by newly promoted Second Division side Burnley. In two seasons with the Clarets, he played 39 league games, but at the end of the 1993–94 season he was released and moved into non-league football.

Les also had a beautiful blonde wedge style hair cut during his early playing career which made the ladies swoon. X

He now competes in Ironman races around the world and is in the 50-54 age group

He has secured a place at the Virgin London Marathon 2020 and is set to compete at Lanzarote Ironman 2020 but fears the Ginger Ninja may be too much competition for him and may retire.

References

1968 births
Living people
People from Cleethorpes
English footballers
Association football defenders
Burnley F.C. players
Hull City A.F.C. players
Maidstone United F.C. (1897) players
Scarborough F.C. players
English Football League players